The Trammps is the debut album by American soul-disco group, The Trammps, released in April 1975 through Golden Fleece Records.

Commercial performance
The album peaked at No. 30 on the R&B albums chart. It also reached No. 159 on the Billboard 200. The album features the singles "Love Epidemic", which peaked at No. 75 on the Hot Soul Singles chart, "Where Do We Go from Here", which charted at No. 44 on the Hot Soul Singles chart, and "Trusting Heart", which reached No. 72 on the Hot Soul Singles chart.  "Where Do We Go From Here" was the last song played on closing night of New York's legendary disco Paradise Garage.

Track listing

Personnel
Dennis Harris – lead guitar
Jimmy Ellis – lead vocal
Michael Thompson – drums
Earl Young – drums, vocal
Doc Wade – guitar, vocal
Stan Wade – bass, vocal
John Hart – organ, vocal
Ron Kersey – piano, vocal
Roger Stevens – trumpet
John Davis – saxophone
Fred Jointer – trombone
MFSB – music

Charts
Album

Singles

References

External links

1975 debut albums
The Trammps albums
Albums produced by Norman Harris
Albums recorded at Sigma Sound Studios